Weaver Lake is a lake in Berrien County, in the U.S. state of Michigan.

Weaver Lake has the name of John Weaver, a pioneer who settled at the lake in 1837.

References

Lakes of Berrien County, Michigan